Robert Bartholomew Pinter was a biomedical engineer and authority on signal processing in the insect visual system.

Education
He received a BS in electrical engineering from Marquette University in 1957 and an MS from Northwestern University in 1960. He received his PhD in electrical engineering and biomedical engineering from Northwestern University in 1964, with a thesis entitled A Study of the Dynamic Properties of the Generator Potential of the Limulus Photoreceptor. His MS and PhD were both under Richard W. Jones.

Career
Pinter has joined the University of Washington in 1964 and held joint appointments with the Departments of Electrical Engineering and Zoology. He also held appointments as visiting professor of psychology at Dalhousie University,
Halifax, Nova Scotia, Canada and visiting fellow of the center for visual sciences, Australian National University, Canberra, Australia.

His research interests were mathematical and electronic models of the visual and nervous system and linear and nonlinear control theory.

Books by Pinter
 Bahram Nabet and Robert B. Pinter, Sensory Neural Networks: Lateral Inhibition, Taylor & Francis Group, 1991, 
 Robert B. Pinter and Bahram Nabet, Nonlinear Vision, Taylor & Francis Group, 1992,

See also

 Insect vision

Notes

References 
 George S. Smith, Early History of the Department of Electrical Engineering, University of Washington, 2005

External links 
 
 Pinter at dlbp
 Article by Pinter

2001 deaths
Educators from Seattle
Marquette University alumni
Robert R. McCormick School of Engineering and Applied Science alumni
University of Washington faculty
1937 births